4008 Corbin, provisional designation , is a stony Phocaea asteroid from the inner regions of the asteroid belt, approximately 6 kilometers in diameter. It was discovered on 22 January 1977, by staff members of the Felix Aguilar Observatory's (formerly known as both, Yale-Columbia Southern Station, and Carlos U. Cesco Station, EACUC) at the Leoncito Astronomical Complex in Argentina.

Orbit and classification 

Corbin is a member of the Phocaea family, a group of asteroids with similar orbital characteristics. It orbits the Sun in the inner main-belt at a distance of 1.9–2.9 AU once every 3 years and 7 months (1,324 days). Its orbit has an eccentricity of 0.21 and an inclination of 26° with respect to the ecliptic.

Physical characteristics 

Corbin has been characterized as a common stony S-type asteroid by PanSTARRS photometric survey.

A photometric lightcurve analysis by Czech astronomer Petr Pravec at Ondřejov Observatory in 2010 rendered a well-defined rotation period of  hours with a brightness amplitude of 0.12 in magnitude.

According to the survey carried out by the NEOWISE mission of NASA's Wide-field Infrared Survey Explorer, the asteroid has an albedo of 0.26 and 0.28 and a diameter of 5.4 and 6.0 kilometers, respectively, while the Collaborative Asteroid Lightcurve Link (CALL) assumes a somewhat lower albedo of 0.23 and calculates a correspondingly larger diameter of 6.4 kilometers.

Naming 

This minor planet was named after American couple Brenda and Thomas Corbin. He was an astronomer at USNO, in charge of the Argentinian EACUC station, and involved in a number of astrometric projects, such as the Astrographic Catalogue Reference Stars. His wife Brenda, who also worked at the EACUC station, is prolific astronomical librarian, known for her work with the Special Libraries Association and in IAU's Working Group on Nomenclature. The official naming citation was published by the Minor Planet Center on 11 February 1998 .

Notes

References

External links 
 Ondrejov Asteroid Photometry Project, Pravec, P.; Wolf, M.; Sarounova, L. (2010) 
 Asteroid Lightcurve Database (LCDB), query form (info )
 Dictionary of Minor Planet Names, Google books
 Asteroids and comets rotation curves, CdR – Observatoire de Genève, Raoul Behrend
 Discovery Circumstances: Numbered Minor Planets (1)-(5000) – Minor Planet Center
 
 

004008
004008
Named minor planets
19770122